The Deseret Power Railway , formerly known as the Deseret-Western Railway, is an electrified private Class III railroad operating in northeastern Utah and northwestern Colorado. It does not connect to the national rail network and has no signaling system.

History

The railroad was built 1983 by Railroad Builders of Englewood, Colorado. All rolling stock was trucked 90 miles via highway from Rifle, Colorado, the nearest point of the national rail network. The railroad began operation in January 1984 as Deseret Western Railway owned by Western Fuels Utah (WFU). This joint company was owned 90% by the Deseret Generation & Transmission Cooperative, which operated the Bonanza Power Plant, and 10% by Western Fuels Association. Its task was to operate the Deserado Mine and transport the produced coal to the power plant.

In December 2001 Deseret Generation & Transmission Cooperative bought the 10% share in WFU from Western Fuels Association and changed the name of WFU into Blue Mountain Energy. At the same time the railroad changed its name to the current Deseret Power Railroad.

Route description
The Deseret Power Railroad exists only to transport coal from the co-operative's Deserado Coal Mine located northeast of Rangely, Colorado and south of Dinosaur, Colorado to their 400 MW Bonanza Power Plant located northwest of Bonanza, Utah. The mined coal is of high-volatile bituminous C quality. Each end of the line has a balloon loop. A siding is located halfway between the power plant and the mine. There are at least three grade crossings on the line, one of which, at Deserado Mine Road, has active warning devices. All other roads use over- or underpasses. The underpasses are typically built as corrugated steel culverts.

The route climbs from the mine over the Holum Pass, the lowest spot in the Skyline Ridge, before descending and crossing Colorado State Highway 64. Afterwards it climbs another ridge before reaching the power plant.

Operations and equipment
The railroad is electrified using an overhead catenary system energized at 50 kV 60 Hz AC to supply power to its electric locomotives.

Motive power initially consisted of two General Electric E60Cs with road numbers WFU-1 and WFU-2. These two locomotives operated a 35-car train twice daily between the mine and the power plant. The trip between power plant and coal mine takes less than one hour.

In September 2001, the locomotives received new road numbers (DPR-1 and DPR-2) when the railroad changed its name. The locomotive lettering was changed from Deseret Western Railroad to Deseret Railroad by painting over the word Western.

At the same time, the railroad purchased two more E60C locomotives second-hand from an abandoned Mexican electrification project. The Ferrocarriles Nacionales de México (NdeM) had ordered a series of 39 locomotives for 25 kV catenary voltage to be used on the new electrified line from Mexico City to Irapuato. Only 28 locomotives from this series entered revenue service, and the surplus locomotives were stored in Mercedes, Texas. Soon after, the electric operation ceased and the catenary was removed to create more clearance for container trains. The two locomotives purchased by Deseret had the road numbers EA031 and EA035. They went first from surplus storage to Texas Utilities, which sold them to the DPR. They kept the original paint scheme including the side wall lettering. Only EA031 entered revenue service as DPR-3 after being converted to 50 kV catenary supply using the railroad's spare transformer.

In February 2003, the railroad received 24 new bottom dump hoppers built by Johnstown America. These cars of the Autoflood III type with 5 bays received road numbers DPR-56 to DPR-79. The cars were brought from the manufacturer to Craig, Colorado, where they were picked up by Blue Mountain Energy and trucked to the Deserado Mine Loadout.

In October 2004, the railroad purchased three more NdeM locomotives, with road numbers EA012, EA017 and EA028. From this batch, only one locomotive entered revenue service as DPR-4. The locomotive had originally the road number EA012 and the conversion to 50 kV was done by rewinding the transformer.

In 2019, a normal weekday saw a 45-car train with three locomotives running once a day, with a second round trip on Tuesday, Wednesday, and Thursday. The two original locomotives and one of the converted former NdeM locomotives were in use.

See also
Navajo Mine Railroad - another electric mine railroad in the US
Black Mesa and Lake Powell Railroad - a former electric mine railroad in the US

References

External links

 UtahRails.net - Deseret Western Railway

Electric railways in Colorado
Electric railways in Utah
1984 establishments in Utah
Railway electrification in the United States
Mining railways in the United States
Mining in Colorado
Energy in Utah
Coal mining in the United States